Blitar Poetra Football Club (simply known as Blitar Poetra) is an Indonesian football club based in Blitar Regency, East Java. They currently compete in the Liga 3.

References

External links

Football clubs in Indonesia
Football clubs in East Java
Sport in East Java
1971 establishments in Indonesia
Association football clubs established in 1971